was a  after Jishō and before Juei. This period spanned the years from July 1181 through May 1182.

Change of era
 1181 : The new era name was created to mark an event or a number of events. The previous era ended and a new one commenced in Jishō 5, on the 14th day of the 7th month of 1181.

Events of the Yōwa era
 1181 (Yōwa 1, 25th day of the 11th month): Tokuko, former consort of the late Emperor Takakura, adopts the name of Kenreimon-in.
 1181 (Yōwa 1): A famine that lasts for two years blights this era.

Notes

References
 Brown, Delmer M. and Ichirō Ishida, eds. (1979).  Gukanshō: The Future and the Past. Berkeley: University of California Press. ;  OCLC 251325323
 Nussbaum, Louis-Frédéric and Käthe Roth. (2005).  Japan encyclopedia. Cambridge: Harvard University Press. ;  OCLC 58053128
 Titsingh, Isaac. (1834). Nihon Odai Ichiran; ou,  Annales des empereurs du Japon.  Paris: Royal Asiatic Society, Oriental Translation Fund of Great Britain and Ireland. OCLC 5850691
 Varley, H. Paul. (1980). A Chronicle of Gods and Sovereigns: Jinnō Shōtōki of Kitabatake Chikafusa. New York: Columbia University Press. ;  OCLC 6042764

External links
 National Diet Library, "The Japanese Calendar" -- historical overview plus illustrative images from library's collection

Japanese eras
1180s in Japan